Wendelstein may refer to:

 Wendelstein (mountain), a mountain in the Chiemgau
 Wendelstein, Bavaria, a town in the district of Roth in Bavaria, Germany
 two experimental stellarators (nuclear fusion reactors) of the Max-Planck-Institut für Plasmaphysik:
 The Wendelstein 7-AS is located in Garching near Munich, Germany
 Its successor, the Wendelstein 7-X operating in Greifswald, Germany